Man Arai ( Arai Man; 7 May 1946 – 3 December 2021) was a Japanese writer and singer. In 1987, he won the Noma Literary New Face Prize for Vexation and Akutagawa Prize in 1988 for Tazunebito no Jikan.

References

External links
 
 

1946 births
2021 deaths
20th-century Japanese novelists
Akutagawa Prize winners
Japanese male singers
Japanese lyricists
20th-century Japanese composers
Japanese male composers
Pony Canyon artists
Sophia University alumni
People from Niigata (city)